Leandro Gelpi Rosales (born 27 February 1991) is a Uruguayan professional footballer. He was called up for the Uruguay Olympic football team, which was competing at the 2012 Summer Olympics, but did not play.

References

External links
 

1991 births
Living people
Footballers from Montevideo
Uruguayan footballers
Uruguayan expatriate footballers
Uruguayan Primera División players
Peñarol players
C.A. Rentistas players
El Tanque Sisley players
Racing Club de Montevideo players
La Equidad footballers
Santiago Morning footballers
Primera B de Chile players
Expatriate footballers in Chile
Expatriate footballers in Colombia
Footballers at the 2012 Summer Olympics
Olympic footballers of Uruguay
Uruguayan people of Italian descent
Association football goalkeepers